Agora is a reflective, prototype-based, object-oriented programming language that is based exclusively on message passing and not delegation. Agora was intended to show that even subject to that limit, it is possible to build a full object-oriented language that features inheritance, cloning and reflective operators.

Overview
The idea is that an object is fully encapsulated and can only be subject to message passing. But seen from the inside of the object, the object knows all about its own structures. It is therefore perfectly capable of cloning and extending itself. This is accomplished by special methods called cloning methods and mixin methods.

Agora98, the latest implementation of Agora, is done in Java and allows full access to all Java APIs, including the ability to create applets from within Agora98. From  the language point of view, Agora98 is a considerable simplification of prior Agora versions.

References
 Agora98: Reflective Programming in a Web Browser, Submitted to ECOOP98.
 A Marriage of Class- and Object-Based Inheritance Without Unwanted Children, Proceedings of ECOOP'95, Springer-Verlag 1995.
 Agora: Message Passing as a Foundation for Exploring OO Language Concepts, SIGPLAN Notices, 29(12):48-57, December 1994.
 Modular Inheritance of Objects Through Mixin-Methods, JMLC'94 Proceedings.
 Nested Mixin-methods in Agora, Proceedings of ECOOP93, Springer-Verlag, 1993.

External links
 Agora home page

Prototype-based programming languages